was a Japanese mathematician working in number theory who introduced Shintani zeta functions and Shintani's unit theorem. Shintani died by suicide at the age of 37 on 14 November 1980.

Notes

References

1943 births
1980 deaths
20th-century Japanese mathematicians